The Vianí Fault is a dextral oblique thrust fault in the department of Cundinamarca in central Colombia.

Etymology 
The fault is named after Vianí, Cundinamarca.

Description 
The Vianí Fault is located on the western slope of the Eastern Ranges of the Colombian Andes. The fault places Lower Cretaceous rocks of the Villeta Group (Trincheras, Simijaca, Hiló and Capotes Formations), to the northwest against Upper Cretaceous rocks of the Güagüaquí Group to the southeast. In the southern area of the fault, the north–south oriented Vianí Fault thrusts the Seca Formation on top of the Hoyón Formation. Farther to the north at Vianí, the fault strike changes to northeast–southwest and the fault displaces the Bituima Fault. The fault trace is characterised by offset spurs, degraded fault scarps, saddles, small pull-apart basins, aligned drainage, and deflected streams. The fault borders the Guaduas Synclinal to the east and south. It forms the northwestern boundary of the Bogotá savanna.

A maximum moment magnitude earthquake is estimated to be 7.2 on the basis of probable rupture of entire fault length.

See also 

 List of earthquakes in Colombia
 Bogotá Fault
 Honda Fault
 Ibagué Fault
 Usme Fault

References

Bibliography

Maps 
 
 

Seismic faults of Colombia
Thrust faults
Strike-slip faults
Inactive faults
Faults
Faults